"The Story of the Blues" is a song by English band Wah!, released as a single in 1982. It was the third single to be released under the name Wah!, after "Forget the Down!" and "Somesay". Wah! was also known as Wah! Heat, Shambeko! Say Wah!, JF Wah!, The Mighty Wah! and Wah! The Mongrel. "The Story of the Blues" is the band's biggest hit, reaching No. 3 on the UK Singles Chart and No. 5 on the Irish Singles Chart.

Track listing
7" single
A. "The Story of the Blues Part One"
B. "The Story of the Blues Part Two (Talkin' Blues)"

12" single
A. "The Story of the Blues Part One and Part Two (Talkin' Blues)"
B. "Seven Minutes to Midnight (Liveish)"

References

1982 songs
1982 singles
Wah! songs
Song recordings produced by Mike Hedges
Warner Music Group singles